Charlie Valentine, also released as The Hitmen Diaries: Charlie Valentine, is a 2009 crime drama starring Raymond J. Barry in the titular role. The film co-stars Michael Weatherly, James Russo, and Tom Berenger, and was shot in Las Vegas, Nevada, and Los Angeles, California. The film was directed by Jesse V. Johnson.

Plot
Aging small-time gangster Charlie Valentine (Barry) tries to pull one over on his boss Rocco (Russo) for some retirement cash. He assembles his old group, and despite Sal's (David) misgivings, they go through with it. The con goes wrong and only Charlie escapes with his life, leaving Rocco furious and demanding revenge. Charlie reconciles with his estranged son Danny (Weatherly) for a place to stay. Danny is curious about his father's lifestyle, though he is apprehensive after serving time in prison. Regardless the two men rob Danny's boss Ferucci (Bauer), who catches on and later finds out about Charlie's hitman life. Ferucci informs Rocco of the Valentines, pinning the two men in a death match in Ferucci's club that leaves only Danny still alive.

Cast
 Raymond J. Barry as Charlie Valentine 
 Michael Weatherly as Danny Valentine
 James Russo as Rocco
 Tom Berenger as Becker 
 Steven Bauer as Ferucci 
 Maxine Bahns as Jenny 
 Keith David as Sal
 Glenn Taranto as Mob Collector
 Dominique Vandenberg as Dom
 Kevin Scott Allen as Marko

Accolades
Director Jesse Johnson won the Best Picture award Action On Film International Film Festival. The film also won for Best Action Film, Best Cinematography, and Best Score.

References

External links

2009 films
2009 crime drama films
Films shot in the Las Vegas Valley
Films shot in Los Angeles
American crime drama films
2000s English-language films
Films directed by Jesse V. Johnson
2000s American films